Alberto Mario Giustolisi (17 March 1928 – 27 February 1990) was an Italian chess International Master (IM) (1962), four-time Italian Chess Championship winner (1952, 1961, 1964, 1966).

Biography
Alberto Mario Giustolisi four time won Italian Chess Championships: 1952 (shared first place with Vincenzo Castaldi and Federico Norcia), 1961, 1964 and 1966. Also he won Italian Team Chess Championships: 1959, 1962, 1963 and 1973. He was numerous Roman chess champion.

Alberto Mario Giustolisi won chess tournaments in Rome in 1951, 1953 and 1974, Acquasparta in 1955, Bellaria in 1956. In 1950 he was third in the Lucerne International Chess Tournament behind Max Euwe and Hermann Pilnik. In 1961-1962 Alberto Mario Giustolisi won, first among the Italians, the New Year's Chess Tournament in Reggio Emilia.

Alberto Mario Giustolisi played for Italy in the Chess Olympiads:
 In 1950, at fourth board in the 9th Chess Olympiad in Dubrovnik (+2, =3, -7),
 In 1968, at first board in the 18th Chess Olympiad in Lugano (+6, =5, -5).

Also Alberto Mario Giustolisi five time played for Italy in the Clare Benedict Chess Cups (1953, 1958-1961).

References

External links

Alberto Mario Giustolisi chess games at 365chess.com

1928 births
1990 deaths
Sportspeople from Rome
Italian chess players
Chess International Masters
Chess Olympiad competitors
20th-century chess players